Piotta is a village in the municipality of Quinto in the Swiss canton of Ticino.

Geography

The village, located next to the neighbouring Ambrì, lies in the Leventina Valley, below the Lepontine Alps, and is crossed in the middle by Ticino river. It is 3 km far from Quinto, 5 from Airolo and 52 from Bellinzona.

Transport
Piotta is the location of the base station of the Ritom funicular, linking the village to Ritom Lake. Along with the neighbouring village of Ambrì, Piotta is served by the infrequently served Ambrì-Piotta railway station on the Gotthard railway, and is located close to Ambri Airport.

Sport
The village hosts the professional ice hockey team HC Ambrì-Piotta, that plays in indoor sporting arena of "Valascia", located in Ambrì.

References

External links

Villages in Ticino